Ugo Mola (born 14 May 1973) is a French rugby union player and coach. He is currently the head coach of Top 14 club Stade Toulousain.

Rugby career

Playing
He made twelve appearances for France during his career, between 1997 and 1999.  He scored a hat-trick of tries against Namibia in the 1999 Rugby World Cup.

Coaching
Mola became Head coach of Stade Toulousain in the summer of 2015. He coaches a fast, off-loading, carefree approach, and has a strong squad,  and sees top-level success as a long term project.

References

1973 births
Living people
French rugby union players
Rugby union wings
Rugby union fullbacks
France international rugby union players
Sportspeople from Gironde
Stade Toulousain coaches
French rugby union coaches
Stade Toulousain players
Castres Olympique players
US Dax players